Sweet Misery may refer to:

 Sweet Misery, 1988 novel by Charlotte Hughes
 Sweet Misery, essay in the 2002 Songbook by Nick Hornby
 "Sweet Misery", 2005 episode of the sitcom Life with Derek

Music
 Sweet Misery (Dylan Kight EP), 2006
 Sweet Misery, 2008 album by The Blackwater Fever

Songs
 "Sweet Misery", by Jimmy Dean on the 1967 country album The Jimmy Dean Show
 "Sweet Misery", by Janis Ian on the 1968 album The Secret Life of J. Eddy Fink
 "Sweet Misery", by Ferlin Husky on the 1971 country album One More Time
 "Sweet Misery", by Hoyt Axton on the 1973 country folk album Less Than the Song, covered by John Denver on the 1973 folk album Farewell Andromeda
 "Sweet Misery", by The Toll on the 1991 rock album Sticks and Stones and Broken Bones
 "Sweet Misery", by Amel Larrieux on the 2000 R&B soul album Infinite Possibilities
 "Sweet Misery", by Michelle Branch on the 2001 alternative/pop rock album The Spirit Room
 "Sweet Misery", by Rashad on the 2003 R&B/R&B album Sweet Misery
 "Sweet Misery", by Tiësto on the 2004 trance album Just Be
 "Sweet Misery", by Lisa Miskovsky on the 2006 pop rock album Changes
 "Sweet Misery", by Digital Summer on the 2008 acoustic album Hollow

See also
 Sweet (disambiguation)
 Misery (disambiguation)